Eureeca is an equity crowdfunding platform with presence in Europe, the Middle East and South East Asia that allows early-stage businesses and small and medium-sized enterprises (SMEs) to raise capital from a group of investors, who range from casual and angel investors to institutional firms, in exchange for equity. Eureeca serves as an alternative financing option to more traditional financing sources such as banks and venture capital firms.

Launched in 2013 by Chris Thomas and Sam Quawasmi, it has since grown into a multi-regulated and cross-continent platform globally with an active investor base of 32,879 from 72 countries with an average investment size of US$5,800.

51 early-stage businesses and SMEs have successfully raised capital through the platform.

Model 
Eureeca utilises an "all or nothing" fundraising model, which requires campaigners to hit their targeted fundraising amount during a 90-day campaign period in order to collect the funds. In the event that the target amount is not reached, members of the crowd who have already invested in the business will have their funds credited back to their Eureeca account for future use.

Eureeca has implemented a "Minimum Target" policy, which allows campaigners to specify a minimum target lower than their total one. This is based on milestones specified in the offering. Companies utilising this target will have it clearly marked on their proposals, and will be allowed to keep anything they raise beyond it.

Funded campaigns
Hundreds of early and later-stage companies have been listed and funded via the platform.

Regulation
Eureeca is regulated by the United Kingdom's Financial Conduct Authority (FCA).

Recognition
In September 2013 Eureeca co-founders Chris Thomas and Sam Quawasmi were presented with the "Innovator of the Year" award Gulf Business Industry Awards in the United Arab Emirates.
In December 2013, Eureeca was named "StartUp of the Year" at the first annual Arabian Business StartUp Awards in Dubai.
In October 2016, Eureeca was named in the "Forbes Top 50 UAE Start Ups To Watch”, placing 3rd in the list.

See also
 Nasser Saidi, Deputy Chairman as of December 2012

References

Crowdfunding platforms